Agastheesvarar Temple is a Hindu temple dedicated to the deity Shiva, located at Kuzhaiyur in Nagapattinam district in Tamil Nadu, India.

Vaippu Sthalam
It is one of the shrines of the Vaippu Sthalams sung by Tamil Saivite Nayanar Appar.

Presiding deity
The presiding deity in the garbhagriha is represented by the lingam known as Agastheesvarar. The Goddess is known as Abirami.

Specialities
When Agastya came to Therazhundur in order to come out from the curse of destroying Vilvalan Vadhabi, he also came to this temple. When the celestial wedding of Lord Shiva took place at Kailash, all the people went there. At that time the north of earth came down and the south went up. In order to make it in order Shiva asked Agastya to go to South. On the advice of the Lord Agastya came to south. During his journey, he halted in this temple and worshipped the deity. As Agastya worshipped this place, it was known as Kuzhaiyur.

Structure 
The temple has no gopuram. An entrance with compound wall is found. This temple has one prakaram. After the entrance front mandapa is found. Goddess is found in the manda, facing south. Near to it the shrine of the presiding deity found, facing east. In front of the deity Nandhi and balipeeta are found. In the west prakara along with two Vinayakas, Agasthia is found. Shrines of   Subramania with his consorts Valli and Deivanai, Kasi Visvanatha with Visalakshi and Bairava are found. Shrine of Vishnu known as Varadharaja Perumal Temple is also found in the right side. Kumbhabhishekham of this temple was held in July 2009.

Location
In Mayiladuthurai-Komal route at Perattakudi this temple is found. In Kumbakonam-Porayar road, through Komal, Perattakudi can be reached. The temple is very near to that place. This is opened for devotees from 10.00 am -11.00 am and 5.00 to 6.30 pm.

References

Hindu temples in Nagapattinam district
Shiva temples in Nagapattinam district